Jeff Kleinman (born September 23, 1988) is an American record producer and composer.  He has produced for artists such as Beyoncé, Frank Ocean, FKA Twigs, Kevin Abstract and Anderson .Paak.  His music is featured in Academy Award-winning film maker Charles Ferguson's documentary film Time To Choose (2016).

Writing/Production discography

Music for film/television

References

1988 births
Living people
Musicians from Brooklyn
Record producers from New York (state)
American male composers
21st-century American composers
21st-century American male musicians